Kraľovany is a village and municipality in Dolný Kubín District in the Žilina Region of northern Slovakia. It lies at the confluence of the Orava and Váh rivers.

References

Villages and municipalities in Dolný Kubín District